Electric Bath is an album by trumpeter Don Ellis recorded in 1967 and released on the Columbia label.

Electric Bath was a Grammy nominee in 1968 and that same year won "Album of the Year" in the annual Down Beat readers poll.
This album was Don's first studio recording with his big band and his first Columbia Records release. It was produced by noted jazz record producer John Hammond.

Reception

Scott Yanow for AllMusic states, "For the first time Ellis opened his band to the influence of rock (making liberal use of electronics) and the results lend themselves to some hilarity".  The Penguin Guide to Jazz said "No one sounded like this. Tough as it sometimes is, Ellis' music  is never less than exhilarating".

Track listing 
All compositions by Don Ellis except as indicated
 "Indian Lady" – 8:06   
 "Alone" (Hank Levy) – 5:32   
 "Turkish Bath" (Ron Myers) – 10:16   
 "Open Beauty" – 8:29   
 "New Horizons" – 12:20
 "Turkish Bath" [Single] (Myers) – 2:52 Bonus track on CD reissue    
 "Indian Lady" [Single] – 2:58 Bonus track on CD reissue

Personnel 
Don Ellis – trumpet, arranger
Alan Weight, Ed Warren, Glenn Stuart, Bob Harmon – trumpet
Ron Myers, Dave Sanchez – trombone
Terry Woodson – bass trombone 
Ruben Leon,  Joe Roccisano – alto saxophone, soprano saxophone, flute
Ira Shulman – tenor saxophone, flute, piccolo flute, clarinet 
Ron Starr – tenor saxophone, flute, clarinet
John Magruder – baritone saxophone, flute, clarinet, bass clarinet 
Mike Lang – piano, electric piano, clavinet 
Frank DeLaRosa, Dave Parlato – bass
Ray Neapolitan – bass, sitar 
Alan Estes – vibraphone, percussion
Steve Bohannon – drums
Chino Valdes – bongos, congas 
Mark Stevens – timbales, percussion, vibraphone

References 

Don Ellis albums
1967 albums
Albums produced by John Hammond (producer)
Columbia Records albums